Anarsia meiosis is a moth in the family Gelechiidae. Park and Ponomarenko described it in 1996. It is found in Thailand.

The wingspan is about 11 mm. The forewings are pale orange, with yellowish brown and dark brown scales beyond three-fifths of the wing. The costal mark is elongate, preceded by two and followed by a dark brown streak on the margin. The hindwings are pale grey.

References

meiosis
Moths described in 1996
Moths of Asia